Frederick Morris (27 August 1893 – 4 July 1962) was an English professional footballer who played as an inside-left forward.

Morris was born in Tipton, Staffordshire. He was top scorer with 37 goals in Division One in West Bromwich Albion's League Championship-winning season of 1919–20.

He died in Tipton, aged 68.

References
Englandstats.com profile

1893 births
1962 deaths
Sportspeople from Tipton
English footballers
England international footballers
West Bromwich Albion F.C. players
Coventry City F.C. players
English Football League players
First Division/Premier League top scorers
Association football inside forwards
English Football League representative players
Fulham F.C. wartime guest players